The 2017–18 Charlotte 49ers women's basketball team represents the University of North Carolina at Charlotte during the 2017–18 NCAA Division I women's basketball season. The 49ers, led by sixth year head coach Cara Consuegra, play their home games at Dale F. Halton Arena and were members of Conference USA. They finished the season 14–16, 10–6 in C-USA play to finish in a 4 way tie for third place. They lost in the first round of the C-USA women's tournament to North Texas.

Previous season
They finished the season 21–10, 12–6 in C-USA play to finish in a tie for fourth place. They advance to the quarterfinals of the C-USA women's tournament where they lost to Louisiana Tech. Despite having 21 wins, they were not invited to a postseason tournament.

Roster

Schedule

|-
!colspan=9 style=| Exhibition

|-
!colspan=9 style=| Non-conference regular season

|-
!colspan=9 style=| Conference USA regular season

|-
!colspan=9 style=| Conference USA Women's Tournament

Rankings
2017–18 NCAA Division I women's basketball rankings

See also
 2017–18 Charlotte 49ers men's basketball team

References

Charlotte 49ers women's basketball seasons
Charlotte